Atractus boimirim is a species of snake in the family Colubridae. The species can be found in Brazil.

References 

Atractus
Reptiles of Brazil
Endemic fauna of Brazil
Snakes of South America
Reptiles described in 2016